Nathan Rafael Ordaz (born January 12, 2004) is a professional footballer who plays as a forward for Major League Soccer club Los Angeles FC. Born in the United States, he represents the Mexico national under-20 team, and has previously represented the El Salvador national under-20 team.

Club career

Los Angeles FC 
Ordaz signed with the Los Angeles FC academy in 2018, after previously competing with club side Real So Cal. He competed with Los Angeles FC Academy in the UPSL in 2021. On 22 April 2022, Ordaz signed a Homegrown Player contract with Los Angeles FC on a contract until 2025. Ordaz was loaned to LAFC's USL Championship affiliate Las Vegas Lights for the 2022 season.

International career
Ordaz is eligible to play for the United States, El Salvador or Mexico. He has represented El Salvador at under-19 in 2021, joining the U-19 team in training camp and playing with the team at the Dallas Cup. He also earned five caps for the under-20 team. In May 2022, Ordaz committed to representing Mexico at international level, and was included in the preliminary roster for the 2022 CONCACAF U-20 Championship.

References

External links
 Profile at Los Angeles FC

2004 births
Living people
American soccer players
Mexican footballers
Mexico under-20 international footballers
Mexico youth international footballers
El Salvador under-20 international footballers
El Salvador youth international footballers
Mexican people of Salvadoran descent
Salvadoran people of Mexican descent
American sportspeople of Mexican descent
Association football forwards
Homegrown Players (MLS)
Las Vegas Lights FC players
Los Angeles FC players
Soccer players from California
USL Championship players
Salvadoran footballers